Abubakar Mahmud Gumi Market, also known as Kaduna Central Market, is the biggest marketplace located in the centre of Kaduna the capital of Kaduna State, Nigeria. It is bordered by Kaduna North to the northeast and Kaduna South to the southwest. The market is one of the largest economic hub of the northern Nigeria region, one of the busiest transportation yard, Ahmadu Bello Way is the major express way that links to various part of the market.

The Vice President Yemi Osinbajo, once visited the market to empower traders. He was accompanied by Governor of Kaduna State Mallam Nasir Ahmad el-Rufai.

History

The original name of the market was Kaduna Central Market, but in 1994 it was renamed after a prominent scholar of Sunni muslim, late Sheik Abubakar Gumi and it is the centre of commerce of Kaduna State and it is owned by the State government. People of different ethnic groups are present in the market, there are Yoruba, Hausa and Igbo, whom share their trading experience as one entity.

First fire outbreak 
On March 16, 2000, over hundreds of traders at the Sheik Abubakar mahmud Gumi Market in Kaduna state, woke up, and found out that their shops were burnt by fire. The fire broke out in the middle of the night, and caused the loss of stalls, money and goods running into millions of Nigerian naira. It was the second time in recent years that such incident happened. another one occurred on the past many years. The unscrupulous activities  elements have turned the Abubakar Gumi Market into a lucrative estate business. The market, which was rebuilt by the government after it was destroyed by fire in 2000, plays a central role in the economic and social lives of the Kaduna people.

The last fire outbreak

Fire razes down many shops at Sheikh Gumi Market, near Bakin Dogo, It was the third time in recent years that such incident had happened, A total of over 31 shops and food items were worth millions of Naira and it was destroyed by fire, this occur on Wednesday 20, 2019. The shops were completely burnt down by  fire. It was rumored that the fire started around 2 O'clock a.m, on Wednesday when most of the shop owners were completely at home, except for the local guards who were at the market. The real source of the fire remained unknown, but the shop owners insist that it was as a result of poor electrical wearing.

References 

Retail markets in Nigeria